Uno-X Pro Cycling Team is a Norwegian professional Women's cycling team, which competes in the UCI Women's World Tour and other elite races. The team was founded in 2021, to compete in the 2022 season. The team is sponsored by Uno-X, who operate a chain of unmanned fuel stations throughout Norway and Denmark.

Team roster

National Champions
2022
 Finland Time Trial, Anniina Ahtosalo
 Finland Road Race, Anniina Ahtosalo
 British Time Trial, Joscelin Lowden

References

Cycling teams based in Norway
Cycling teams established in 2021